is a Japanese variety tarento and former gravure idol. Her real name was  before she got married. She is represented with Platinum Production.

Filmography

TV series

Current appearances

Former appearances

Radio

Current appearances

Former appearances

Magazine serialisations

Dramas

Films

Advertising campaigns

Bibliography and discography

Photo albums

 Others

Videos and DVD

 Others

CD

As Chinatsu Wakatsuki

As Chinachable
Credited under the name Chinachable with the comedy duo Untouchable.

Trading cards

References

External links
 

Japanese television personalities
Japanese gravure idols
Japanese actresses
Japanese fashion designers
People from Saitama Prefecture
1984 births
Living people
Avex Group artists
Japanese women fashion designers